Pat Daly (4 December 1927 – 1 January 2003), also known as Paddy Daly was an Irish former footballer who played as a centre half.

He joined Shamrock Rovers in 1948 as a defender. He also had a brief spell in England with Aston Villa in the 1949–50 season playing just three games for the Birmingham-based club.

He won his one and only senior cap for the Republic of Ireland national football team on 8 September 1949 in a 3–0 win over Finland in Dalymount Park, Dublin in a World Cup Qualifying game. Daly's appearance that day was shrouded in controversy, however. The FAI had unwittingly infringed the rules of the World Cup tournament by bringing on a substitute, which at the time, prohibited players being replaced.

Daly represented the League of Ireland XI on 3 occasions while at Glenmalure Park.

Honours
League of Ireland Shield
  Shamrock Rovers - 1951/52

Sources
 The Hoops by Paul Doolan and Robert Goggins

External links
Pat Daly at Aston Villa Player Database

Association footballers from County Dublin
Republic of Ireland association footballers
Ireland (FAI) international footballers
Shamrock Rovers F.C. players
Aston Villa F.C. players
League of Ireland players
English Football League players
1927 births
2003 deaths
League of Ireland XI players
Association football defenders